Deylaman Rural District is a rural district (dehestan) in Deylaman District, Siahkal County, Gilan Province, Iran. At the 2006 census, its population was 6,827, in 2,049 families. The rural district has 57 villages.

References 

Rural Districts of Gilan Province
Siahkal County